

Northern Transvaal results in the 1993 Currie cup

 Northern Transvaal did not qualify for the 1993 Currie Cup final.

Statistics

1993 Currie cup log position

1988 - 1993 results summary (including play off matches)

Northern Transvaal
1993